is a Japanese football player, who plays as a goalkeeper for Yokohama F. Marinos, on loan from Gamba Osaka.

Career
Ichimori grew up in the Cerezo Osaka youth ranks, alongside players like Takahiro Ogihara and Ryo Nagai. After failing to get to the first squad, he decided to join Kwansei Gakuin University Soccer Club as a regular student.

In May 2014, Ichimori joined JFL-side Renofa Yamaguchi. He gradually gained a starter-spot as goalkeeper: his displays were so good he was chosen as one of the best players in 2014 season. In the club's first season in J3, Ichimori played all the games and contributed to win the league.

Club statistics
Updated to 23 February 2018.

References

External links
Profile at Renofa Yamaguchi

1991 births
Living people
Kwansei Gakuin University alumni
Association football people from Osaka Prefecture
Japanese footballers
J1 League players
J2 League players
J3 League players
Japan Football League players
Renofa Yamaguchi FC players
Fagiano Okayama players
Gamba Osaka players
Association football goalkeepers
People from Izumisano